Uppingham railway station was a station in Uppingham, Rutland.

The station buildings were demolished and the site became a small industrial area.

References

Disused railway stations in Rutland
Former London and North Western Railway stations
Railway stations in Great Britain opened in 1894
Railway stations in Great Britain closed in 1960
Uppingham